Christian Ditter (born 1 June 1977) is a German director, producer and screenwriter who has worked on films, television and commercials. He is best known for his films , (2009) Love, Rosie (2014), and How to Be Single (2016) and the Netflix series Girlboss (2017).

Early life 
Ditter was born on 1 June 1977 in Giessen, Hesse. He graduated from the Evangelisch Stiftisches Gymnasium Gütersloh in 1996 and went to the University of Lüneburg from 1997 to 1998, majoring in Applied Cultural Studies. He then focused his studies on directing at the University of Television and Film Munich from 1998 to 2006.

Career 
While in school, Ditter's short films Enchanted (2000) and Grounded (2003) won numerous awards at international film festivals. His debut feature film French for Beginners hit theaters in 2006. He subsequently directed on the Adolf Grimme Prize and the German Television Award-winning series Turkish for Beginners (2007) and on the award-winning series Doctor's Diary (2008).

In 2008, he adapted the popular German children's book, The Crocodiles, for the big screen. He moved on to writing and directing Germany's first major adventure film shot entirely in 3D, Vicky and the Treasure of the Gods, which debuted at No. 1 in the German box office.

In 2014, he directed his first English-language feature Love, Rosie starring Lily Collins and Sam Claflin. In 2016, he followed it up with his U.S. debut How to Be Single starring Dakota Johnson, Rebel Wilson, Leslie Mann and Alison Brie. After working with Kay Cannon on How to Be Single, they partnered with Charlize Theron's company Denver and Delilah to create the Netflix series Girlboss in 2017, loosely based on the book #Girlboss by Nasty Gal founder Sophia Amoruso.

Ditter served as the showrunner-director of the Netflix series Biohackers, of which the first season was released in 2020.

Filmography

References

External links 
 

1977 births
Living people
Mass media people from Hesse
People from Giessen